Middlebury Academy may refer to:

Middlebury Academy (Wyoming, New York), listed on the National Register of Historic Places in New York
Middlebury Academy (Middlebury, Vermont), the predecessor of Middlebury College